Capricious Summer is a 1968 Czechoslovak comedy film directed by Jiří Menzel. It is based on the novel Rozmarné léto (Summer of Caprice) by the Czech writer Vladislav Vančura. It was listed to compete at the 1968 Cannes Film Festival, but the festival was cancelled due to the events of May 1968 in France. The film won the Crystal Globe at 1968 Karlovy Vary International Film Festival.

The film depicts a humorous story of three men, a major (an artillery officer), a priest and a bath-keeper, during rainy summer days.

Plot summary

Cast
 Rudolf Hrušínský as Antonín Dura
 Vlastimil Brodský as Major Hugo
 František Řehák as priest / abbé / canon Roch
 Míla Myslíková as Kateřina Durová
 Jana Preissová as Anna (as Jana Drchalová)
 Jiří Menzel as Arnoštek, the tightrope walker
 Bohuš Záhorský as old man
 Vlasta Jelínková as housemaid (as V. Jelínková)
 Alois Vachek as man in a pub (as A. Vachek)
 Bohumil Koska as man in a pub (as B. Koska)
 Karel Hovorka as man in a pub (as K. Hovorka)
 Antonín Pražák as policeman (as A. Prazak)
 Pavel Bosek as Mayor (as P. Bosek)

References

External links
 
 
 
 

1968 films
1968 comedy films
Czech comedy films
Czechoslovak comedy films
1960s Czech-language films
Films directed by Jiří Menzel
Crystal Globe winners
1960s Czech films